Liam Mac Curtain an Dúna, also rendered as 'Uilliam MacCurtain', William Curtain, Irish Gaelic: Mac Cairteáin an-Dúna or Liam an Dúna Mac Cairteáin, French: Gulielmus Curtain (c.1668-Nov. 1724) was an Irish poet and scholar. His works remain primarily in print in the Gaelic tongue.

Life and work

While he was a member of the Macartan lineage from County Down, and descended from Eachmilidh Macartan, he is said to have been born in the town on Doon in County Cork, the son of Phelim Mac Curtain, an Ensign in the Army of King Charles II. However, which 'Doon' this is in Munster a matter of speculation, as it is a common prefix to Irish placenames.

Mac Curtain appears to descend from the famous Lords of Kinelarty and appears to have been of some means among the Gaelic gentry. During the Williamite Wars he served in a Spanish cavalry regiment of King James II and the local MacCarthy or MacCartney lords in Desmond. He fought at the battle of Béal Átha Salainn (Six Mile Water, County Antrim 29 April 1691) a few miles from his ancestral home, where he led the men of his district in an ambush on a group of Williamite soldiers. When peace was finally concluded in the 1690s he settled in the town of Dromboy, near Carrignavar in Co. Cork. There he assumed the position of schoolmaster, where he translated texts from Latin and Gaelic, and wrote poetry. Most of his works are dedicated to the Gaelic gentry which had recently become dispossessed of their land by the English crown. When Dermot Mac Carthaig died in 1705, Mac Curtain took his place as head of the bardic school, a post he held until his own death in 1724. Subsequent to his death, the school relocated to Blarney, further south in Co. Cork.

The bulk of Mac Curtain's work remains untranslated, but it is noted that he dedicated his prose to other members of the Gaelic intelligentsia who survived the Williamite persecutions. One work he dedicated to his close friend, John Baptist MacSleyne, titular Bishop of Cork. He went on to collect local legends which would be woven into James Macpherson's magnum opus, translated and compiling the famous works of Oisín in the early 18th century.

He died at Longstone, near Whitechurch, Co. Cork, where he was buried. William was brother to Conchobhar Mac Curtain, and the nephew of Fr. Cornelius Curtain. He was survived by his children, Lesa Ní Mhunghaile relates that he had two other sons, and at least one daughter. He was succeeded at the bardic school by Liam Ruadh Mac Coitir. His grandson John MacCurtain (Sean an Duna) appears to have continued that family ties to the bardic school, serving as a patron in the late 18th century.

List of literary works

 Address to Sir James FitzEdmond Cotter (1700)
  (1701)
 The Lion of the Province of Ulster (1703)
  (1703)
 
 
 
 
 On Tentoring in Horseback
 
 The horseman in the North of Doudhrim

Translations
Conduct, I beseech thee, O Father and King of Heaven,
Home across the main our cavalcade of strong heroes,
In Justice and valour and vigour without loss of health,
And scatter without much respite the army beyond the sea.

Through riches and wealth I have none, I have squandered and lost them too soon, I cherish the friendship of one, Who is constant, kind-hearted and true.

References

External links
Uilliam MacCurtin's list at School of Celtic Studies 
 http://homepage.eircom.net/~carrignavaronline/History/History%20Main.htm
 https://archive.today/20130105093545/http://www.smccartan.utvinternet.com/williamMcC.htm

1658 births
1724 deaths
Irish poets
Irish-language poets
Irish soldiers in the army of James II of England
17th-century Irish people
18th-century Irish people
Irish Jacobites
People from County Cork
Date of birth unknown